"Westside" is the debut single by TQ, from his 1998 debut album, They Never Saw Me Coming. The song was produced by Bay-area producers Femi Ojetunde and Mike Mosley, with TQ serving as co-producer. The song is an anthemic ode to TQ's native California. In the song's lyrics, he mentions several other California musicians who influenced him; Ice Cube, Eazy-E, Ice-T, Too Short and DJ Quik. At the end of "Westside", TQ dedicates the song to the deceased Eazy-E and Tupac Shakur.

Released late in 1998, "Westside" became a breakthrough hit for TQ, reaching No. 12 on the Billboard Hot 100 in the United States, while also becoming a top 10 hit in several other countries, including the United Kingdom (No. 4), Ireland (No. 5) and the Netherlands (No. 3). In the US, "Westside" was certified gold by the RIAA for sales of 500,000 copies on October 22, 1998. The song also took the final spot on the Billboard Year-End Hot 100 singles of 1998.

Single track listing
"Westside" (Album Version)- 5:02
"Westside" (Radio Version)- 3:52
"Bye Bye Baby" (Snippet)- 1:12
"Westside" (Instrumental Version)- 5:07
"Bye Bye Baby (Snippet)"- 1:12

Westside Part II / Westside Part III (single) 
"Westside Part II (My Melody)" (feat. DJ Quik, Hi-C, James DeBarge, Playa Hamm & Suga Free (Clean Version) - 4:42
"Westside Part II (My Melody)" (feat. DJ Quik, Hi-C, James DeBarge, Playa Hamm & Suga Free (Dirty Version) - 4:42
"Westside Part II (My Melody)" (Instrumental) - 4:42
"Westside Part III (Bud'da Remix)" (feat. Jayo Felony & Kam (Clean Version) - 4:04
"Westside Part III (Bud'da Remix)" (feat. Jayo Felony & Kam (Dirty Version) - 4:04
"Westside Part II (Bud'da Remix)" (Instrumental) - 4:04

Charts and certifications

Weekly charts

Year-end charts

Certifications

References

1998 debut singles
TQ (singer) songs
Song recordings produced by DJ Quik
1998 songs
Epic Records singles
Contemporary R&B ballads